Araneus detrimentosus is a species of orb weaver in the spider family Araneidae. It is found in a range from the United States to Colombia.

References

Araneus
Articles created by Qbugbot
Spiders described in 1889